Iouri Bekichev is a Russian mixed martial artist. He competed in the Light heavyweight and Heavyweight divisions.

Mixed martial arts record

|-
| Win
| align=center| 2-5
| Hiromitsu Kanehara
| TKO
| Rings Russia: CIS vs. The World
| 
| align=center| 1
| align=center| 0:00
| Yekaterinburg, Sverdlovsk Oblast, Russia
| 
|-
| Loss
| align=center| 1-5
| Valentin Golubovskij
| Decision (2-0 points)
| Rings Lithuania: Bushido Rings 2
| 
| align=center| 2
| align=center| 0:00
| Vilnius, Lithuania
| 
|-
| Loss
| align=center| 1-4
| Jeremy Horn
| Submission (arm-triangle choke)
| Rings: World Title Series 1
| 
| align=center| 1
| align=center| 0:50
| Kanagawa, Japan
| 
|-
| Loss
| align=center| 1-3
| Emil Kristev
| Decision (1-0 points)
| Rings Russia: Russia vs. Bulgaria
| 
| align=center| 1
| align=center| 10:00
| Yekaterinburg, Russia
| 
|-
| Win
| align=center| 1-2
| Chris Haseman
| KO (punch)
| Rings Russia: Russia vs. The World
| 
| align=center| 1
| align=center| 2:30
| Yekaterinburg, Sverdlovsk Oblast, Russia
| 
|-
| Loss
| align=center| 0-2
| Bob Schrijber
| TKO
| Rings Russia: Russia vs. Holland
| 
| align=center| 1
| align=center| 3:01
| Yekaterinburg, Russia
| 
|-
| Loss
| align=center| 0-1
| Peter Dijkman
| Submission (rear naked choke)
| Rings Holland: The Final Challenge
| 
| align=center| 1
| align=center| 2:25
| Amsterdam, North Holland, Netherlands
|

See also
List of male mixed martial artists

References

Russian male mixed martial artists
Light heavyweight mixed martial artists
Heavyweight mixed martial artists
Living people
1965 births